The Holtkamp Organ Company of Cleveland, Ohio is one of America's oldest builders of pipe organs. Founded in 1855 by G.F. Votteler, the company was passed on to the Holtkamps in 1931. Under the direction of Walter Holtkamp Sr., the company became famous as a pioneer of the Organ Reform Movement in the United States.

Holtkamp organs typically make much use of exposed pipe-work to, in the words of Walter Holtkamp, allow the audience to see and hear the organ better. Holtkamp organs also typically have a non-traditional console, which looks something like a couple of keyboards and stops just placed on a desk.
In the early 1940s Walter Holtkamp built his first and last organ console in the French style.  It was for him a miserable failure.  However, it had been designed with a low "French" profile because the organist for whom it was built was very short and had a difficult time looking over a typical organ music rack to his choir.  Holtkamp, therefore, embarked on designing what became the Holtkamp console for reasons of clean sight lines outward from the player's desk.

When in the United States for a lecture at the University of Chicago in 1949, Albert Schweitzer visited Cleveland to play the Holtkamp Rückpositiv at the Cleveland Museum of Art, the only American instrument he requested play. "Bravo for the first Rückpositiv in America," Schweitzer had written to Walter Holtkamp from Günsbach, Alsace, May 22, 1934. "I congratulate."

References

External links 
 Holtkamp Organ Company

Manufacturing companies based in Cleveland
Pipe organ building companies
1855 establishments in Ohio
Musical instrument manufacturing companies of the United States